Christianity is the largest religion in Uruguay, with Catholics having the most adherents, but around 44.5% of the population is non-religious as of 2021. Church and state are officially separated since 1916.

Discrimination along religious lines is punishable by law, and the government generally respects people's religious freedom. However, apart from Christianity and to a lesser extent Umbanda and Judaism, other world religions such as Islam, Buddhism and Hinduism, etc., have a negligible presence in country.

Demographics 

According to an official survey in 2006, approximately 58.2% of Uruguayans defined themselves as Christian (47.1% Roman Catholic, 11.1% Protestant), and approximately 40.4% of the population professes no religion (23.2% as deist, 17.2% as atheist or agnostic), 0.6% as followers of Umbanda or other African religions, 0.5% as Jewish, 0.1% Buddhist and 0.4% chose "other".

Although the majority of Uruguayans do not actively practice a religion, they are nominally members of the Catholic church. However, Protestants are more active. The first Anglican church in the country was erected in 1844 by British traders, and is considered a historical landmark. Other religious groups in Uruguay include the Jehovah's Witnesses and the Mennonites. It is widely considered the most secular nation in the Americas. One cause of this was that Spanish colonial missions sent priests to convert indigenous people, who had always been a very small population in Uruguay.

According to a study by Latinobarómetro in 2010, 39% of Uruguayans are Roman Catholics and 11% are Evangelical Protestants. 3% of the population practices other religions such as Buddhism, Judaism, Islam. Within that 3% are included those who refused to answer the survey.

Religious freedom
The Constitution of Uruguay provides for the freedom of religion and states that "the State supports no religion". Discrimination on religious grounds is illegal. The National Institute of Human Rights, part of the parliament, hears complaints of religious discrimination and conducts investigations, ultimately deciding whether the case should receive a judicial or administrative hearing. The institute also provides free legal resources to complainants.

Religious groups may register with the government as nonprofit organizations in order to receive tax breaks. Local government regulates the use of public land for burials. Many departments allow for all religious groups to use public cemeteries.

Religious instruction is prohibited in public schools. Although public schools close for certain Christian holidays, the government does not refer to these holidays by their Christian names. Students belonging to other religions may miss classes to observe their religious traditions without penalty. Private schools may decide which holidays to observe.

Minority non-Abrahamic religious groups reported no cases of discrimination against them by the government in 2017. They also claimed, however, that the government demonstrated more interest in engaging with Christian and Jewish groups, and that they had few opportunities for direct dialogue with the government. Such groups also complained that a lack of knowledge of their beliefs in general society sometimes led to discrimination, and that they were at times verbally harassed in public due to their beliefs. The Jewish community has been targeted by antisemitic graffiti, and antisemitic rhetoric is present on Uruguayan websites and social media.

In 2017 there were tensions between the Catholic Church and the government of Montevideo due to the government's refusal to install a statue of the Virgin Mary on a major public road. Church representatives alleged that this was particularly controversial because the government had previously approved statues of Confucius and Yemọja along the road. Supporters of the Virgin Mary statue used its rejection as a justification for opposing requests from the Muslim community of Montevideo to use land in the public ceremony for Muslim burial rites. As of the end of 2017, the Muslim community's request was pending.

See also
Roman Catholic Church in Uruguay
Irreligion in Uruguay
Hinduism in Uruguay
Islam in Uruguay
Judaism in Uruguay
Bahá'í Faith in Uruguay

References

External links

 U.S. Department of State Country Report on Religious Freedom in Uruguay, 2013